This is a list of candidates for the 1859 New South Wales colonial election. The election was held from 9 June to 7 July 1859.

There was no recognisable party structure at this election.

Retiring Members
Andrew Aldcorn MLA (St Vincent)
Richard Bowker MLA (North Eastern Boroughs)
Henry Buckley MLA (Stanley County)
Robert Campbell MLA (Sydney City)
George Cox MLA (Wellington (County))
Stuart Donaldson MLA (Cumberland (South Riding))
Peter Faucett MLA (King and Georgiana)
William Lee MLA (Roxburgh)
Edward Lloyd MLA (Liverpool Plains and Gwydir)
James Macarthur MLA (West Camden)
George Macleay MLA (Murrumbidgee)
John Marks MLA (East Camden)
John Paterson MLA (Lachlan and Lower Darling)
Thomas Smith MLA (Cumberland (North Riding))
William Taylor MLA (New England and Macleay)
George Thornton MLA (Sydney City)
Robert Tooth MLA (Sydney City)
George White MLA (Northumberland and Hunter)

Legislative Assembly
Sitting members are shown in bold text. Successful candidates are highlighted.

Electorates are arranged chronologically from the day the poll was held. Because of the sequence of polling, some sitting members who were defeated in their constituencies were then able to contest other constituencies later in the polling period. On the second occasion, these members are shown in italic text.

See also
 Members of the New South Wales Legislative Assembly, 1859–1860

References
 

1859